Boniface Gambila Adagbila (born June 9, 1959) is a Ghanaian politician and member of the Sixth Parliament of the Fourth Republic of Ghana representing the Nabdam Constituency in the Upper East Region on the ticket of the New Patriotic Party.

Personal life 
Adagbila is married with three children. He is a Catholic.

Early life and education 
Adagbila was born on June 9, 1959. He hails from  Damolg-Tindongo, a town in the Upper East Region of Ghana. He entered the University of Ghana and obtained his master's degree in Psychology and Political Science in 1986. He also attended the University of Manchester and obtained a postgraduate diploma in Human Resource Training and Development in 1992.

Politics 
Adagbila is a member of the New Patriotic Party (NPP). In 2012, he contested for the Nabdam seat on the ticket of the NPP sixth parliament of the fourth republic and won.

Employment 
 Manager/administrator
 Human resource practitioner
 Executive Director of National Service Scheme, 2002–2005
 Upper East Regional Minister, 2005–2007
 Principal Trainer (BSMP & PTUA), VRA Accra

References

1959 births
Living people
New Patriotic Party politicians
Ghanaian MPs 2013–2017
Ghanaian MPs 2017–2021